Biphenyl (also known as diphenyl, phenylbenzene, 1,1′-biphenyl, lemonene or BP) is an organic compound that forms colorless  crystals.  Particularly in older literature, compounds containing the functional group consisting of biphenyl less one hydrogen (the site at which it is attached) may use the prefixes xenyl or diphenylyl.

It has a distinctively pleasant smell. Biphenyl is an aromatic hydrocarbon with a molecular formula (C6H5)2. It is notable as a starting material for the production of polychlorinated biphenyls (PCBs), which were once widely used as dielectric fluids and heat transfer agents.

Biphenyl is also an intermediate for the production of a host of other organic compounds such as emulsifiers, optical brighteners, crop protection products, and plastics. Biphenyl is insoluble in water, but soluble in typical organic solvents. The biphenyl molecule consists of two connected phenyl rings.

Properties and occurrence
Biphenyl occurs naturally in coal tar, crude oil, and natural gas and can be isolated from these sources via distillation.  It is produced industrially as a byproduct of  the dealkylation of toluene to produce methane:
C6H5CH3 + C6H6 -> C6H5-C6H5 + CH4
The other principal route is by the oxidative dehydrogenation of benzene:
2 C6H6 + 1/2 O2 -> C6H5-C6H5 + H2O
Annually 40,000,000 kg are produced by these routes.

In the laboratory, biphenyl can also be synthesized by treating phenylmagnesium bromide with copper(II) salts.

It can also be prepared by diazonium salts. When Aniline is treated with NaNO2+dil HCl at 278K, it yields Benzene diazonium chloride. When it is further reacted with Benzene, Biphenyl is formed. It is known as Gomberg Bachmann Reaction.

Ph-NH2->[\text{NaNO}_2\text{(aq), HCl}][T\text{=273-278K}]  Ph-N2+ ->[\text{Ph-H, Δ}] Ph-Ph

Reactions and uses
Lacking functional groups, biphenyl is fairly non-reactive, which is the basis of its main application. In the laboratory, biphenyl is mainly used as a heat transfer agent as a eutectic mixture with diphenyl ether. This mixture is stable to 400 °C.

Biphenyl does undergo sulfonation which, followed by base hydrolysis, produces p-hydroxybiphenyl and p,p′-dihydroxybiphenyl, which are useful fungicides. In other substitution reactions, it undergoes halogenation.  Polychlorinated biphenyls were once popular pesticides.

Lithium biphenyl contains the radical anion, which is highly reducing (-3.1 V vs Fc+/0).  Several solvates of alkali metal salts of biphenyl anion have been characterized by X-ray crystallography. These salts, usually prepared in situ, are versatile reducing agents. Lithium biphenyl offers some advantages relative to the related lithium naphthene.  Related to Li/biphenyl is the derivative with two tert-butyl groups on the biphenyl.

Stereochemistry
Rotation about the single bond in biphenyl, and especially its ortho-substituted derivatives, is sterically hindered. For this reason, some substituted biphenyls show atropisomerism; that is, the individual C2-symmetric-isomers are optically stable. Some derivatives, as well as related molecules such as BINAP, find application as ligands in asymmetric synthesis. In the case of unsubstituted biphenyl, the equilibrium torsional angle is 44.4° and the torsional barriers are quite small, 6.0 kJ/mol at 0° and 6.5 kJ/mol at 90°. Adding ortho substituents greatly increases the barrier: in the case of the 2,2'-dimethyl derivative, the barrier is 17.4 kcal/mol (72.8 kJ/mol).

Biological aspects
Biphenyl prevents the growth of molds and fungus, and is therefore used as a preservative (E230, in combination with E231, E232 and E233), particularly in the preservation of citrus fruits during transportation. It is no longer approved as a food additive in the European Union.

It is mildly toxic, but can be degraded biologically by conversion into nontoxic compounds. Some bacteria are able to hydroxylate biphenyl and its polychlorinated biphenyls (PCBs).

It is part of the active group in the antibiotic oritavancin.

Biphenyl compounds
Substituted biphenyls have many uses.  They are prepared by various coupling reactions including the Suzuki-Miyaura reaction and the Ullmann reaction. Polychlorinated biphenyls were once used as cooling and insulating fluids and polybrominated biphenyls are flame retardants. The biphenyl motif also appears in drugs such as diflunisal and telmisartan. The abbreviation E7 stands for a liquid crystal mixture consisting of several cyanobiphenyls with long aliphatic tails used commercially in liquid crystal displays (5CB, 7CB, 8OCB and 5CT). A variety of benzidine derivatives are used in dyes and polymers. Research into biphenyl liquid crystal candidates mainly focuses on molecules with highly polar heads (for example cyano or halide groups) and aliphatic tails.

See also
 Naphthalene, where the rings are fused
 Terphenyl, three ringed analog
 Bithiophene

Notes

References
 "Isolation and Identification of Biphenyls from West Edmond Crude Oil". N. G. Adams and D. M. Richardson. Analytical Chemistry 1953 25 (7), 1073–1074.
 Biphenyl (1,1-Biphenyl). Wiley/VCH, Weinheim (1991), .

External links

 CDC - NIOSH Pocket Guide to Chemical Hazards
 National Pollutant Inventory - Biphenyl
 External MSDS

 
Preservatives
Phenyl compounds